The name "olivaceous flycatcher" can also refer to the dusky-capped flycatcher (Myiarchus tuberculifer) of the Americas.

The olivaceous flycatcher (Muscicapa olivascens) or olivaceous alseonax, is a species of bird in the family Muscicapidae.
It is sparsely distributed throughout the African tropical rainforest.
Its natural habitats are subtropical or tropical moist lowland forest and subtropical or tropical swamps.

References

olivaceous flycatcher
Birds of the African tropical rainforest
olivaceous flycatcher
Taxonomy articles created by Polbot
Taxobox binomials not recognized by IUCN